Pedro Luis Boitel (May 13, 1931–May 25, 1972) was a Cuban poet and dissident who opposed the governments of both Fulgencio Batista and Fidel Castro. In 1961, he was sentenced to 10 years in prison.

Boitel died during a hunger strike in prison in 1972 while serving a sentence handed down by the communist regime.

Before the revolution
Pedro Luis Boitel was born into a humble family originally from Picardy (France), and studied at the University of Havana while also working as a radio technician.   In the 1950s Boitel opposed the government of Fulgencio Batista and went into exile in Venezuela where he collaborated with Rómulo Betancourt in his efforts to overthrow Marcos Pérez Jiménez's military government by setting up a pirate radio station in that country.

After the Cuban Revolution, Boitel returned to Cuba and resumed his studies at the University of Havana.  In 1959, Boitel ran for president of the University Students' Federation (Federación Estudiantil Universitaria; FEU) at the University of Havana and was backed by the 26th of July Movement. Even though Fidel Castro headed this movement, Castro and the other revolutionary leaders removed their support for Boitel. Castro personally intervened in the student elections at the University of Havana to remove Boitel from the FEU presidency.

Jail and hunger strike

As a Christian, Boitel became dissatisfied with political events in Cuba and formed a clandestine organization, The Movement to Recuperate the Revolution (MRR).  In 1961 Boitel was detained and accused of conspiracy against the state, and was summarily sentenced to ten years in jail.
He was not released after the 10-year sentence. It is claimed that Boitel was tortured and beaten several times and that his mother Claretta was humiliated when she went to visit him in jail. The Inter-American Commission of Human Rights found that the Cuban government had violated Article I of the American Declaration on the Rights and Duties of Man in their treatment of the prisoner.  Boitel sought authorization to leave Cuba but his requests were denied.

On April 3, 1972, Boitel declared himself on hunger strike. After 53 days on hunger strike without receiving medical assistance and receiving only liquids, he died of starvation on May 25, 1972. His last days were related by his close friend, poet Armando Valladares.  He was buried in an unmarked grave in the Cólon Cemetery in Havana.

In 1973, the year after Boitel died, Claretta gave an interview about her son via a phone conversation with Tomás Regalado, a news editor for WFAB, a Spanish language radio station in Miami, Florida. The phone call was recorded for WFAB (with Claretta's permission), lasted for 20-minutes and aired on the station the same year (again, Claretta gave permission). The phone call was also notable because foreign telephone calls out of Cuba were closely monitored. This call was apparently unnoticed by the Cuban government who were unaware of it until it aired on the radio. The Cuban government bans journalists from having interviews with dissidents or their relatives.

References

External links
Foreword to Boitel Vive Gabriel Salvia y Hans Blomeier
The story of Pedro Luis Boitel

See also

Human rights in Cuba
Opposition to Fidel Castro

1931 births
1972 deaths
Cuban male poets
Cuban dissidents
Cuban democracy activists
Opposition to Fidel Castro
People who died on hunger strike
Cuban people who died in prison custody
Prisoners who died in Cuban detention
Nonviolence advocates
People of the Cuban Revolution
20th-century Cuban poets
Cuban people of French descent